Chalaroderma is a genus of combtooth blennies found in the southeast Atlantic ocean.

Species
There are currently two recognized species in this genus:
 Chalaroderma capito (Valenciennes, 1836) (Looseskin blenny)
 Chalaroderma ocellata (Gilchrist & W. W. Thompson, 1908) (Two-eyed blenny)

References

 
Salarinae